Patrick Corrales (born March 20, 1941) is an American former professional baseball catcher, manager, and coach, who played in Major League Baseball (MLB), from 1964 to 1973, primarily for the Cincinnati Reds as well as the Philadelphia Phillies, St. Louis Cardinals, and San Diego Padres. He is the first major league manager of Mexican American descent.

Early life and playing career
Corrales was a baseball and football star at Fresno High School in Fresno, California and a teammate of future major-league pitchers Jim Maloney and Dick Ellsworth. An offensive guard and linebacker, he was named lineman of the year by the Fresno Bee. After high school, he signed as an amateur free agent with the Phillies in 1959.

He made his major league playing debut at age 23 on August 2, 1964, with the Phillies. He pinch-hit for pitcher John Boozer in the fifth inning, grounding out against the Los Angeles Dodgers' Larry Miller in a 6-1 Phillies loss at Connie Mack Stadium. His first career hit came the next year on June 15, 1965, in a 12-7 Phillies loss to the Milwaukee Braves at County Stadium when he singled in the eighth inning off Tony Cloninger and later scored. He had one of his best career games the next day when, in a 6-2 Phillies win over the Braves, he started at catcher and went 3–4 with his first major league home run (a two-run shot in the third inning against Denny Lemaster).

In a nine-year playing career as a backup catcher (including to Baseball Hall of Famer Johnny Bench), Corrales played in 300 games with 166 hits, four home runs, 54 runs batted in and a .216 batting average. He appeared in one game of the 1970 World Series for the Reds and batted once, grounding out for the final out of the series as the Reds fell in five games to the Baltimore Orioles.

Manager and coach

Managerial and coaching career
Corrales spent nine years as a major league manager and finished with an overall record of 572–634 with the Texas Rangers, Phillies and Cleveland Indians. Corrales managed in both the National League and American League, and became only the fourth manager to manage in both leagues in the same season.

He is the only MLB manager ever to be fired by a first-place ballclub when general manager Paul Owens replaced him on July 18, 1983, despite the Phillies having a 43–42 record and tied for first place with the St. Louis Cardinals in the National League East.

After being fired in 1987 as manager of the Indians he has had a long career as a bench coach. He was in that role for nine years with the Atlanta Braves, and was with Washington Nationals for the 2007 and 2008 seasons before being fired at the end of 2008 along with the majority of the Nationals' coaching staff. Shortly after being fired, he accepted a job as a special consultant to the Nationals. He resumed as bench coach in July 2009 after Jim Riggleman was appointed acting manager after Manny Acta was fired. Corrales was once again appointed Nats bench coach in June, 2011 by new manager Davey Johnson. Corrales replaced John McLaren, who had been reassigned to scouting duty.

On November 5, 2012, Corrales was hired by the Los Angeles Dodgers as a special assistant to the General Manager.

Managerial record

Personal life
Pat Corrales married Sharon Ann Grimes on September 24, 1960. and had four children. Sharon died from a blood clot soon after giving birth to the couple's fourth child in July 1969.
He married Heidyt Enedina Davis, May 28, 1970, in Jellico, Campbell County Tennessee.

He was inducted as a member of the Fresno County Athletic Hall of Fame in 1980.

References

External links

Pat Corrales at SABR (Baseball BioProject)
Pat Corrales at Baseball Almanac

1941 births
Living people
Alexandria Aces players
American baseball players of Mexican descent
Arkansas Travelers players
Atlanta Braves coaches
Bakersfield Bears players
Baseball players from Los Angeles
Chattanooga Lookouts players
Cincinnati Reds players
Cleveland Indians managers
Dallas Rangers players
Des Moines Demons players
Hawaii Islanders players
Indianapolis Indians players
Johnson City Phillies players
Los Angeles Dodgers executives
Major League Baseball bench coaches
Major League Baseball bullpen coaches
Major League Baseball catchers
Major League Baseball first base coaches
New York Yankees coaches
Philadelphia Phillies managers
Philadelphia Phillies players
St. Louis Cardinals players
San Diego Padres players
Tampa Tarpons (1957–1987) players
Texas Rangers coaches
Texas Rangers managers
Tulsa Oilers (baseball) players
Washington Nationals coaches
Williamsport Grays players
Baseball coaches from California
People from Fresno, California